Thomas or Tom Courtenay may refer to:

Thomas Courtenay (of Wootton Courtenay) (died 1356), knight
Thomas de Courtenay, 5th/13th Earl of Devon (1414–1458)
Thomas Courtenay, 6th/14th Earl of Devon (1432–1461)
Thomas Courtenay (British politician) (1782–1841), British politician and author
Thomas Edgeworth Courtenay (1822–1875), member of the Confederate Secret Service and inventor of the coal torpedo
Tom Courtenay (born 1937), English actor 
Tom Courtenay (EP), by Yo La Tengo

See also
Thomas Courtney (disambiguation)